Villuri Venkataramana (15 May 1923 – 1978) was an Indian politician. He was a Member of Parliament  representing Andhra  Pradesh in the Rajya Sabha the upper house of India's Parliament as member  of the  Indian National Congress. Venkataramana died in 1978.

References

1923 births
1978 deaths
Indian National Congress politicians
Rajya Sabha members from Andhra Pradesh